Bruno Feldeisen (born  ) is a French chef, restaurateur and television personality. He is current executive chef at the Semiahmoo Resort near Blaine, Washington and a judge for The Great Canadian Baking Show on CBC Television. Aside from his work as a chef, Feldeisen is a spokesman for the mental health advocacy group AnxietyBC.

He is the former executive pastry chef for the Four Seasons Hotel New York in New York City and Four Seasons Hotel Vancouver in Vancouver. Feldeisen is also a former instructor at the Pacific Institute of Culinary Arts and a multiple James Beard Award nominee.

Early life
Feldeisen was born in Clermont-Ferrand, France. He moved to the United States in the 1980s and permanently relocated to Vancouver in 2007.

Television career
He has been a competitor on the cooking competition reality series Sweet Genius, Chopped Canada, Donut Showdown, and Beat Bobby Flay.

Since November 2017, Feldeisen has been a judge for The Great Canadian Baking Show, a Canadian adaptation of The Great British Bake Off produced for CBC Television.

References

External links
 

1960s births
Businesspeople from Vancouver
Canadian restaurateurs
Canadian television chefs
French chefs
French emigrants to Canada
French emigrants to the United States
French restaurateurs
Living people
Pastry chefs
Businesspeople from Clermont-Ferrand
People from Blaine, Washington
Canadian male chefs